Georg Matthäus Vischer (22 April 1628 – 13 December 1696) was an Austrian topographer, cartographer, engraver and parish priest in Leonstein (Upper Austria) and Vienna.

Vischer was born in Wenns (Tyrol).  Despite his clerical vocation, geography and topographical surveys were Vischer's true calling. On behalf of nobility and clergy he compiled maps and created engravings and drawings of more than 1000 cities, castles, manors, abbeys and cloisters in the regions of Lower Austria, Upper Austria, Upper Styria, Lower Styria, Moravia and Hungary. In most cases Vischer's engravings are amongst the oldest preserved depictions of these structures. He is regarded as one of the most important Austrian cartographers and topographers of his time.  He died, aged 68, in Linz (Upper Austria).

Works 
 Archiducatus Austriae Superioris Descriptio facta Anno 1667. A Map of Upper Austria.
 Archiducatus Austriae Inferioris Accuratissima Geographica Descriptio. A Map of Lower Austria, Vienna 1670
 Topographia Austriae superioris modernae. Copper Engravings of Upper Austrian Castles and Mansions (1674)
 Archiducatus Austriae Inferioris Geographica et Noviter Emendata Accuratissima Descriptio, Vienna 1697
 Topographia archiducatus Austriae Inferioris modernae 1672, Vienna 1672
 Topographia Ducatus Stiriae, Graz 1681

References

External links 

 Topographia Austriae superioris modernae: das ist Contrafee und Abbildung aller Stätt, Clöster ... des Ertz-Herzogthumbs Österreich ob der Ennß: E-Book from the Library of the University of Vienna
 	Archiducatus Austriae Inferioris Accuratissima Geographica Descriptio (Vischer Map for Lower Austria für Niederösterreich): E-Book from the Library of the University of Vienna
 
 

1628 births
1696 deaths
17th-century Austrian people
Austrian cartographers
Topographers
17th-century engravers